The Kola Peninsula tundra ecoregion (WWF ID: PA1106) is an ecoregion that covers the northeastern half of the Kola Peninsula, along the coast of the White Sea, a marginal sea of the Arctic Ocean. The maritime effects of the White Sea create a milder climate than would be expected for a region of this latitude. It is in the Palearctic realm, and the tundra biome.

Location and description 
The northernmost segments of this ecoregion are on the northern coast of Fennoscandia, facing the Barents Sea. The more southerly regions are the northeastern edge of the Kola Peninsula, facing the White Sea.

Climate 
The region has a Humid continental climate - cool summer subtype (Koppen classification Dfc). Mean precipitation is about 512 mm/year.

Flora and fauna 
The cold climate and northerly latitude puts much of the region above the arctic treeline, with trees limited or sparse.  The flora is primarily mosses, lichens and shrubs. Among the shrubs are the dwarf birch (Betula nana) and the Camemoro (Rubus chamaemorus). Large mammals of the area include herds of reindeer, which migrate into the tundra in Spring from the boreal forests to the south.

Protections 
Over 7% of the ecoregion is in an officially protected area, including all or a portion of:
 Kandalaksha Nature Reserve
 Varangerhalvøya National Park

References 

Ecoregions of Norway
Ecoregions of Russia
Murmansk Oblast
Geography of Finnmark
Palearctic ecoregions
Tundra ecoregions
Tourist attractions in Murmansk Oblast